Seh Tolun (also Romanized as Seh Tolūn; also known as Seh Talvan and Seh Tūlūn) is a village in Abolfares Rural District, in the Central District of Ramhormoz County, Khuzestan Province, Iran. At the 2006 census, its population was 1,121, in 219 families.

References 

Populated places in Ramhormoz County